The 1958 Tour de Suisse was the 22nd edition of the Tour de Suisse cycle race and was held from 11 June to 18 June 1958. The race started and finished in Zürich. The race was won by Pasquale Fornara.

General classification

References

1958
Tour de Suisse
1958 Challenge Desgrange-Colombo
1958 in road cycling
June 1958 sports events in Europe